Ngwesaung, also spelt Ngwe Hsaung, is a beach resort located 48 km west of Pathein, Ayeyarwady Region, Myanmar. It is the namesake of Ngwesaung Subtownship, Pathein Township. In 2014, the town of Ngwesaung had 10,732 people. The beach is 5 hours drive, with no traffic, away from the principal city of Yangon, and an airport is in the works. Buses leave at 6am & 9:30pm from in front of the Yangon Central Railway Station. Opened in March 2000, Ngwe Hsaung is newer than nearby and more popular Chaung Thar Beach, and is designed to attract people with larger holiday budgets.

Tourism
An unspoilt  stretch of silvery sand and modern amenities have made Ngwe Hsaung a popular destination for less budget conscious tourists from Lower Myanmar. Still Ngwe Hsaung has much to develop. Its choices for nightlife activities remain paltry, even by local standards. Chaung Thar and Ngapali beaches have greater choices of nighttime activities. At this point, a nearby elephant training camp is a main daytime attraction at Ngwe Hsaung.

The Calventuras Islands are a group of islets lying about 9 km to the west of Broken Point.

References

Populated places in Ayeyarwady Region
Beaches of Myanmar
Tourist attractions in Myanmar